Once Upon a Time: A Floating Opera is a novel by American writer John Barth, published in 1994.  A character named John Barth and his female companion set sail on Chesapeake Bay on the 500th anniversary of Columbus's discovery of America and are unexpectedly caught in a tropical storm.  While trying to find his way out of the Maryland marshes, Barth comes across a "metaphysical zone" in which he encounters scenes and characters from his previous novels.  The title references Barth's first novel, The Floating Opera (1956).

References

Works cited

1994 novels
Works about Chesapeake Bay
Little, Brown and Company books
Novels by John Barth
Novels set in Maryland